Freziera minima is a species of plant in the Pentaphylacaceae family. It is endemic to Ecuador.  Its natural habitats are subtropical or tropical moist montane forests and subtropical or tropical high-altitude shrubland.

References

minima
Endemic flora of Ecuador
Vulnerable plants
Taxonomy articles created by Polbot